The 2005–06 season is Hyderabad cricket team's 72nd competitive season. The Hyderabad cricket team is senior men's domestic cricket team based in the city of Hyderabad, India, run by the Hyderabad Cricket Association. They represent the region of Telangana in the state of Andhra Pradesh in domestic competitions.

Competition Overview

Squads
 Head coach: Rajesh Yadav

Rayudu and Suman moved from the Hyderabad to the Andhra ahead of the 2005–06 season.

NKP Salve Challenger Trophy
Laxman got picked to the India A squad for the 2005-06 NKP Salve Challenger Trophy, a List-A cricket tournament in India.

Duleep Trophy
Laxman, Anirudh, Ojha, Arjun Yadav and Khaleel got selected to the South Zone squad for the 2005-06 Duleep Trophy, a first-class cricket tournament in India. But, Laxman later withdrew himself from the squad.

Deodhar Trophy
Inder Shekar, Vinay Kumar and Khaleel got selected to the South Zone squad for the 2005-06 Deodhar Trophy, a List-A cricket competition in India.

Ranji Trophy

The Hyderabad team, led by Arjun Yadav, began their campaign in the Ranji Trophy, the premier first-class cricket tournament in India, with a draw against the Andhra at Anantapur on 1 December 2005. The Hyderabad captain, Arjun Yadav attacked his opponent and former teammate Ambati Rayudu with stumps following his dismissal and altercation between Rayudu and Hyderabad players during the Hyderabad's second innings on the final day of the match against Andhra. They finished fourth in Group B of the Elite League and failed to advance to the knockout stage with a win, three losses and two draws.

Points Table
Elite Group B

  Top two teams advanced to the knockout stage.
  Bottom team relegated to the Plate Group for the 2006–07 Ranji Trophy.
 Points system : Win by an innings or 10 wickets = 5, Win = 4, Draw with first innings lead = 2, No Result = 2, Draw with first innings deficit = 0, Loss = 0.

Matches
Group Stage

Statistics
Most runs

 Source: Cricinfo
Most wickets

 Source: Cricinfo

Ranji One–Day Trophy
The Hyderabad team, led by Arjun Yadav, began their campaign in the Subbaiah Pillai Trophy as part of the South Zone Ranji One–Day Trophy, a List-A cricket tournament in India, with a loss against the Goa at Hyderabad on 10 February 2006. The century from Chandrashekar Raghu and five-wickets shared between Sunil Joshi and Balachandra Akhil ensured the Karnataka win by 72 runs. The Hyderabad lost in a low-scoring thriller to the Andhra by one run in the second match as the half-centuries from Ambati Rayudu and Gnaneswara Rao completed the chase for the Andhra despite 123-run partnership between Devishetty Vinay Kumar and Ibrahim Khaleel for the Hyderabad. The century from Hemang Badani and tight bowling by the Tamil Nadu bowlers with Ganapathi Vignesh and Sridharan Sriram taking the key wickets gave the Hyderabad their third loss of the tournament as the Tamil Nadu defeated the Hyderabad by 66 runs. Sony Cheruvathur's four-wicket haul and the century from Somasetty Suresh ensured the Kerala defeat the Hyderabad by seven wickets in their fourth match of the tournament. The Hyderabad top-order collapsed but the 100-run stand between Amol Shinde and Syed Quadri helped them recover to 189 before Suresh completed the chase for the Kerala. The Hyderabad suffered their fifth straight loss in the tournament as the collective effort from the Goa and the half-century from Sagun Kamat and brisk scoring at the end by Kapil Angle helped the Goa win over the Hyderabad by one wicket. The Hyderabad finished last in the South Zone and failed to qualify to the knockout stage with no wins and five losses.

Points Table
South Zone

Matches
Zonal Stage

Statistics
Most runs

 Source: Cricinfo
Most wickets

 Source: Cricinfo

See also
 Hyderabad cricket team
 Hyderabad Cricket Association

References

External links
Hyderabad cricket team official site

Cricket in Hyderabad, India
Cricket in Telangana
Sport in Telangana